= Martin Wilkinson (ethicist) =

New Zealand–British political philosopher

Timothy Martin Wilkinson
- Born: 21 March 1968 (age 58); Aldershot, United Kingdom
- Citizenship: New Zealand, United Kingdom

Academic background
- Education: University of Oxford
- Thesis: Liberalism, Socialism, and Occupational Choice (1993)

Academic work
- Discipline: Political philosophy; bioethics
- Institutions: University of Auckland
- Notable works: The Ethics of Public Health Paternalism (2025)

Timothy Martin Wilkinson (born 21 March 1968) is a New Zealand–British political philosopher whose work examines the moral limits of public-health policy. He is professor of Politics and International Relations at the University of Auckland.

== Early life and education ==
Wilkinson was born in Aldershot, Hampshire. He studied Philosophy, Politics and Economics at Exeter College, Oxford, graduating first-class in 1989, and completed a D.Phil. at Nuffield College, Oxford in 1993 with a dissertation on occupational choice.

== Career ==
Wilkinson joined the University of Auckland’s Department of Political Studies in 1993, became senior lecturer in the School of Population Health in 2003, and was promoted to full professor in 2016. In 2010, he held a Leverhulme Visiting Professorship at Keele University’s Centre for Professional Ethics.

From 2006 to 2009 he chaired Toi te Taiao: The Bioethics Council, having earlier served as a founding member. He was deputy-chair (2010–2016) and then member of the National Ethics Advisory Committee (NEAC) at the Ministry of Health, contributing to work streams on advance-care planning and clinical-trials governance.

== Research and publications ==
Wilkinson's research asks when, if ever, the state may override individual autonomy for health gains. His books include:

- 'The Ethics of Public Health Paternalism (Oxford University Press, 2025). A university news feature summarised the book's claim that many "nanny-state" policies leave people worse off.
- Ethics and the Acquisition of Organs (Oxford University Press, 2011)
- Freedom, Efficiency and Equality (Palgrave Macmillan, 2000)
